The 1983 UCF Knights football season was the fifth season for the team. It was Lou Saban's first as the head coach of the Knights. Looking to bounce back from a winless 1982 season, Saban's 1983 team earned a respectable 5–6 overall record. The Knights competed as an NCAA Division II Independent. The team played their home games at the Citrus Bowl in Downtown Orlando

In their rivalry game against the Bethune–Cookman, the two schools played for short-lived "Interstate 4 Trophy."

On October 29, UCF notched their first  victory against a Division I-AA opponent, defeating Austin Peay 10–7.

Schedule

References

UCF
UCF Knights football seasons
UCF Knights football